The Terrible Lovers (French: Les amants terribles) is a 1936 French comedy film directed by Marc Allégret and starring Gaby Morlay, André Luguet and Marie Glory. It is based on Noël Coward's play Private Lives.

The film's sets were designed by the art director Guy de Gastyne.

Cast
 Gaby Morlay as Annette Fournier  
 André Luguet as Daniel Fournier  
 Marie Glory as Lucie  
 Henri Guisol s Victor  
 Charles Granval as Le clochard  
 Henri Crémieux as L'avocat de Daniel 
 Robert Vattier as L'avocat de Annette  
 Raymond Aimos as Un gendarme  
 Henri Vilbert as Un gendarme  
 Robert Goupil as Le gardien du Palais  
 Arthur Devère as Le portier de l'hôtel  
 Sinoël 
 Émile Genevois 
 Guy Rapp

References

Bibliography 
 James Robert Parish. Film Actors Guide. Scarecrow Press, 1977.

External links 
 

1936 films
French comedy films
1936 comedy films
1930s French-language films
Films directed by Marc Allégret
Pathé films
French black-and-white films
1930s French films